Singanamala is a village in Anantapur district of the Indian state of Andhra Pradesh. It is the mandal headquarters of Singanamala mandal in Anantapur revenue division.

Geography 
It has an average elevation of 287 metres (944 ft).

References 

Villages in Anantapur district
Mandal headquarters in Anantapur district